The Venerable Ian Thomas Stanes  was an eminent Anglican priest in the second half of the 20th century.

Stanes was educated at Sheffield University and Linacre College, Oxford and ordained in 1966. After a curacy at Holy Apostles, Leicester he was the Vicar of Broom Leys, Coalville. After this he was Priest Warden of Marrick Priory from 1976 to 1982 and the Willesden Area Officer for Mission, Ministry and Evangelism, London for a decade after that. In 1992 he became Archdeacon of Loughborough, a post he held until his retirement in 2005.

Notes

1939 births
Alumni of the University of Sheffield
Alumni of Linacre College, Oxford
Archdeacons of Loughborough
Living people